Castle Park may refer to:

In England:
 Castle Park, Bristol
 Castle Park House, Frodsham, Cheshire
 Castle Park Cricket Ground, Colchester
 Castle Park rugby stadium, home of the Doncaster Knights

In the United States:
 Castle Park, Michigan, an unincorporated community in Laketown Township
 Castle Park (amusement park), Riverside, California
 Castle Park High School, Chula Vista, California

In Wales:
 Castle Park, Caerphilly, a residential area of the town of Caerphilly